The 1999 Speedway Grand Prix of Great Britain was the fourth race of the 1999 Speedway Grand Prix season. It took place on 31 July at the Brandon Stadium in Coventry, England

Starting positions draw 

The Speedway Grand Prix Commission nominated British rider Mark Loram and a Scott Nicholls as Wild Card.

Heat details

The intermediate classification

See also 
 Speedway Grand Prix
 List of Speedway Grand Prix riders

References

External links 
 FIM-live.com
 SpeedwayWorld.tv

G
Speedway Grand Prix
1999
Speedway Grand Prix of Great Britain
Speedway Grand Prix of Great Britain